The Junín canastero (Asthenes virgata) is a species of bird in the family Furnariidae. It is endemic to Peru. Its natural habitat is subtropical or tropical high-altitude grassland.

References

Junín canastero
Birds of the Peruvian Andes
Endemic birds of Peru
Junín canastero
Junín canastero
Taxonomy articles created by Polbot